Pasaia is the name of two distinct railway stations in Pasaia, Spain.

Pasaia station (Euskotren)